Thunder and Lightning is a 1977 action comedy film directed by Corey Allen, and starring David Carradine and Kate Jackson.

Plot
The plot involves moonshine runners in Florida who are trying to stay independent in the face of attempts by organized crime to take over their business.

Cast

Main
 David Carradine as Harley Thomas
 Kate Jackson as Nancy Sue Hunnicutt
 Sterling Holloway as Hobe Carpenter
 Patrick Cranshaw as Taylor
 Charles Napier as Jim Bob
 George Murdock as Jake Summers
 Ron Feinberg as Bubba

Supporting
 Roger C. Carmel as Ralph Junior Hunnicutt
 Hope Pomerance as Mrs. Hunnicutt
 Eddie Barth as Rudi Volpone (credited as Ed Barth)
 Malcolm Jones as Rainey
 Charles Willeford as Bartender
 Christopher Raynolds as Scooter
 Claude Earl Jones as Carl (credited as Claude Jones)
 Emilio Rivera as Honeydew Driver

Cameo appearance/uncredited
 Richard Holden as Race Announcer

Notes
At one stage the film was reportedly going to star Susan George and Roger Corman met with Jimmy Connors about playing the male lead. Carradine signed in March 1976.

The script was originally set in Georgia but was relocated to the Florida Everglades in order to take advantage of the beauty of that area.

It was Sterling Holloway's final film role.
It was Roger Corman's last of four films produced for 20th Century Fox (the others were Fighting Mad, Capone and Moving Violation).

Reception
The film was popular and Corey Allen worked for Corman again on Avalanche (1978).

References

External links

Review of film at The New York Times

1977 films
1970s action comedy films
American action comedy films
Films about alcoholic drinks
Films about automobiles
20th Century Fox films
1977 comedy films
Films directed by Corey Allen
1970s English-language films
1970s American films